La Chapelle-Bâton is a commune in the Vienne department in the Nouvelle-Aquitaine region in western France. It is 8 km northeast from Civray. In the mid to late 1990s it was one of the communes in France where, with the support of the local community, test drilling was carried out in an effort to create an underground nuclear waste storage/processing facility. After it was found to be geologically unsuitable, plans were subsequently abandoned.

See also
 Communes of the Vienne department

References

Communes of Vienne